Elmington is a historic home located near Powhatan, Powhatan County, Virginia. It was designed by Alexander Jackson Davis (1803-1892) and built in 1858. It is a two-story, three bay, brick dwelling.  It has a gable roof with large overhanging bracketed eaves in the Italianate style. Later expansions of the home were not undertaken due to the American Civil War. 

It was added to the National Register of Historic Places in 2005.

References

Houses on the National Register of Historic Places in Virginia
Italianate architecture in Virginia
Houses completed in 1858
Houses in Powhatan County, Virginia
National Register of Historic Places in Powhatan County, Virginia